Dimethylaminoisopropanol is a chemical compound with the molecular formula C5H13NO that is classified as an amino alcohol.  It is used as a building block in organic synthesis. Under the name dimepranol, it is also used as an active ingredient in some pharmaceutical formulations such as inosine pranobex.

References

Secondary alcohols
Dimethylamino compounds